Wardle (pop. 7,092) is a village near Littleborough within the Metropolitan Borough of Rochdale, in Greater Manchester, England.

Historically a part of Lancashire, Wardle and its surroundings have provided archaeological evidence of Mesolithic activity in the area. The name Wardle is said to be derived from "Ward Hill", implying "fortified place". Brown Wardle Hill overlooks the village from the north, its name being derived from the Celtic word bron meaning "round". During the Middle Ages Wardle was a small centre of domestic flannel and woollen cloth production, and many of the original weavers' cottages survive today as listed buildings.

Wardle, the most northerly settlement in Greater Manchester, encompasses small parts of Smallbridge and Dearnley — urban areas contiguous with Rochdale — but "retains a rural character". Watergrove Reservoir, which is situated on the northern outskirts of Wardle, is the largest of a series of reservoirs in the Borough of Rochdale, with a storage capacity of 720 million gallons. Wardle comprises 17th- and 18th-century stone churches, farmhouses and cottages by the hills. The village square is preserved as a place of historic interest.

Governance

Lying within the historic county boundaries of Lancashire since the early 12th century, Wardle was anciently linked with Wuerdle, and lay within the township of Hundersfield and parish of Rochdale. Wuerdle and Wardle would later split from Hundersfield to form a township of itself, still within the parish of Rochdale and in the hundred of Salford.

Wardle's first local authority was a Local board of health established in 1874; Wuerdle and Wardle Local Board of Health was a regulatory body responsible for standards of hygiene and sanitation in the township. In 1879 part of the neighbouring township of Butterworth was included in the area of the Local Board. Under the Local Government Act 1894, the area of the local board broadly became the Wardle Urban District, a local government district in the Rochdale Poor Law Union and administrative county of Lancashire. Part of the Milnrow Urban District was added to it in the same year.

Under the Local Government Act 1972, the Wardle Urban District was abolished, and Wardle has, since 1 April 1974, formed an unparished area of the Metropolitan Borough of Rochdale, within the Metropolitan county of Greater Manchester.

Geography

Wardle is the most northerly settlement in Greater Manchester.

Wardle is south of the Watergrove Reservoir and west of Littleborough.

Education

The village is home to St James Primary School and a secondary school, Wardle Academy.

See also

Listed buildings in Wardle, Greater Manchester

References

Notes

External links

Wardle and Smallbridge History Group Home page of the local history group

Bibliography

Villages in Greater Manchester
Unparished areas in Greater Manchester
Geography of the Metropolitan Borough of Rochdale